Northumberland County may refer to:

 Northumberland County, New South Wales, Australia, a cadastral division
 Northumberland County, New Brunswick, Canada
 Northumberland County, Ontario, Canada
 Northumberland County, Pennsylvania, United States
 Northumberland County, Virginia, United States

See also
Northumberland, a county of England

County name disambiguation pages